The jack-in-the-box effect is a specific effect of a catastrophic kill on a tank or other turreted armored vehicle in which an ammunition explosion causes the tank's turret to be violently blown off the chassis and into the air. It is named after the child's toy, the jack-in-the-box, in which a puppet pops up. Most of the time the crew inside does not survive.

Mechanics 
If an anti-tank projectile or shaped-charge blast manages to penetrate a turreted armored vehicle's hull and subsequently its ammunition storage area, the shock wave or heat and pressure can be sufficient to cause cooking off or sympathetic detonation of the tank's unfired explosive shells and propellant. This causes a massive and instantaneous overpressure in the sealed internal compartment of the tank, which is released by exploding outwards through the weakest point in the otherwise homogeneous compartment, namely, the turret ring. This blows the turret completely off the chassis and into the air in a gush of flame.

The jack-in-the-box effect is known to occur in tanks which are "buttoned up" (i.e. with all hatches closed and locked), and which have internally stored ammunition and no blow-off panels on the ammunition storage area. Tanks of the World War II era were frequently seen to have lost their turrets in this manner, largely owing to the design of that era, as at the time the need for special shielding of the tank's ammunition storage compartments was not recognized. Some modern tanks, such as the Russian T-72, T-80, and T-90, feature a compact three-crew design with an auto-loading mechanism, which eliminated the need for a fourth crew member to serve as the loader. While this gives the tank a lower profile, so it can better avoid getting hit by enemy tanks, the tradeoff is being extremely vulnerable once hit (even in an indirect hit). Hits will likely set off the ammunition, which is stored in a ring along the inside of the turret right next to the crew. The newest Russian tanks are still susceptible to this effect, even with composite armour and reactive armour, as they retain the compact three-crew cabin and autoloader.

Many modern Western tanks (for instance, the M1 Abrams, Leopard 2, and Leclerc series) feature ammunition compartments designed to fail safely under fire, reducing damage to the level of a firepower kill. In such designs, when the tank is damaged, blowout panels open to channel ignited propellants and explosives away from the crew cabin. These tanks have a loader as the fourth crew member. Training doctrine mandates that the ammunition compartment door must be closed before loading the main gun, so that there is only one shell likely to be exposed in the turret at any time, which limits the risk to the crew. Whether an enemy hit ruptures the ammunition compartment or penetrates the tank's interior, the crew have a higher chance of survival, so they are more likely to return the tank to a maintenance center or at least escape their disabled vehicle.

References

Bibliography 

The Eve of Destruction: The Untold Story of the Yom Kippur War, Howard Blum, Harper Perennial, 2004
Tanks of World War II; Jane's Information Group, HarperResource, 1995
Jane's Tank Recognition Guide, Christopher F. Foss and Jane's Information Group, Harper-Collins Publishers, 2003

Military slang and jargon
Armoured warfare